YHLQMDLG (acronym for "Yo Hago Lo Que Me Da La Gana", Spanish for "I Do Whatever I Want") is the second solo studio album and third overall by Puerto Rican rapper and singer Bad Bunny. It was released on February 29, 2020, by Rimas Entertainment. The album's music style is heavily influenced by "old-school" reggaeton, and features guest appearances from Daddy Yankee, Nesi, Yaviah, Ñengo Flow, Sech, Mora, Jowell & Randy, Anuel AA, Myke Towers, Kendo Kaponi, Arcángel, Duki and Pablo Chill-E.

The album debuted at number two on the US Billboard 200, becoming the highest-charting all-Spanish album ever on the chart at the time, until the release of his third album, El Último Tour Del Mundo. YHLQMDLG was the best selling Latin album in the United States of 2020, became Spotify's most streamed album globally of 2020, and won for Best Latin Pop or Urban Album at the 63rd Annual Grammy Awards.

Since the album's release, the album message has inspired many fans to get tattoos of the acronym. The popularity of YHLQMDLG tattoos has been documented in several news and media outlets, with some tattoo artists reporting an increase in requests for the design. In March 2020, Rolling Stone magazine reported that the tattoo had become a "quarantine trend," with many people getting the tattoo as a way to mark the difficult time.

While the popularity of YHLQMDLG tattoos has been widely reported, some critics have expressed concern that the trend could be seen as appropriating Latin culture without fully understanding its significance. In response to these criticisms, some tattoo artists have emphasized the importance of being respectful and mindful when getting tattoos of cultural symbols.

Overall, the YHLQMDLG cover art has become a notable cultural icon, and the popularity of YHLQMDLG tattoos is a reflection of the album's impact on popular culture.

Background and singles 
"Vete" was released as the lead single of the album on November 22, 2019. The album title was first mentioned during a sequence of the accompanying music video. The second single "Ignorantes" with Panamanian singer Sech came out on February 14, 2020. Bad Bunny announced the album on February 27, 2020, and stated that it would be released on Leap Day 2020.

Composition 
YHLQMDLG is a primarily a Latin trap and reggaeton album that also incorporates elements of pop, rock, hip-hop, R&B, reggae, dancehall, ballad, acoustic, electronic, lo-fi, bachata, dembow, and sandungueo. Billboard had described the album as an "old-school perreo, romantic reggaeton, and Latin trap with global appeal. It is a departure from Bad Bunny's Latin trap style showcased on his very beginnings and focuses more on fun, bouncy, and aggressive reggaeton beats, and lyrics. Bad Bunny's vision for the album was for it to bring back the “glory days” of reggaeton, drawing inspiration from it, like the song “Safaera”, which is a heavy, 00's-inspired, beat switching described as "reggaeton symphony",  which features Puerto Rican duo Jowell y Randy and Nengo Flow. The album also features Latin trap sounds, incorporating the widely known 808 drum patterns, and both fun and aggressive melodies, such as in “Si Veo A Tu Mama”, which samples the bossa-nova classic "The Girl from Ipanema", featuring a sweet, Nintendo-ish keyboard sound, while the song “25/8” is an example of the dark, hard-hitting melodies that some of the trap songs in the record share. Lyrically, Bad Bunny sings and raps about themes such as women, partying, heartbreak, and women's empowerment, an example of it is the song “Yo Perreo Sola”, which talks about a girl whom Bad Bunny wants to dance with, but she refuses, because according to her, Bad Bunny also refused to dance with her in the past, so now he is the one who is "begging". In the last track of the album, “<3”, Bad Bunny thanks all his fans and a team of work for supporting and believing in him, while also expressing his desire to retire and live with no more stress, closing both the song and album with the title of the record.

Critical reception 

YHLQMDLG received widespread critical acclaim. At Metacritic, which assigns a normalised rating out of 100 to reviews from mainstream critics, the album has an average score of 88 based on five reviews, indicating "universal acclaim".

Writing for AllMusic, Thom Jurek stated Bad Bunny "turns the notion of the cohesive urban statement into a sprawling 20-track mix of styles, production techniques, and completely accessible hooks in a work of peerless musical invention," and described YHLQMDLG as "a transformative fever dream of an album that accents freedom by breaking all the rules without writing new ones." In Rolling Stone, Suzy Exposito gave YHLQMDLG 4.5 stars, writing that Bad Bunny "convenes a family reunion of his favorite rappers and reggaetoneros to produce a genre-promiscuous work of reggaeton a la marquesina." For Consequence of Sound, Lucas Villa wrote that Bad Bunny "is emerging as a rarity in the game like the mythical Mew. Benito is game-sharking a system that was once othering Latin music artists with his perreo takeover of pop." Matthew Ismael Ruiz in Pitchfork deemed the album "outstanding" and described it as "a big party record that pushes boundaries and pays homage to reggaetón's past and future, all made by a swaggering star with absolutely nothing to prove."

Accolades

Commercial performance 
YHLQMDLG debuted at number two on the US Billboard 200 dated March 14, 2020, earning 179,000 album-equivalent units, including 35,000 pure album sales in its first week. It earned  201.4 million on-demand streams in the country, achieving the biggest streaming week ever for a Latin album, surpassing the record set by Ozuna's Aura (2018, 53.2 million streams). It became the highest-charting all-Spanish album to ever appear on the chart at the time—before he broke his own record with El Último Tour Del Mundos release in November, which debuted atop the chart. Previous record-holders for an all-Spanish-language albums were Shakira's Fijación Oral, Vol. 1 (2005) and Maná's Amar es Combatir (2006), both at number four, while two mostly-Spanish albums have reached number one, Selena's Dreaming of You (1995) and Il Divo's Ancora (2006). In its second week, the album dropped to number three on the chart, earning an additional 111,000 units. In its third week, the album remained at number three on the chart, earning 69,000 more units. In its fourth week, the album fell to number four on the chart, with 51,000 units. YHLGMLG was the best selling Latin Album of 2020 in the United States with 1,444,000 album-equivalent units. In 2021 and 2022, it was the second best selling latin album with 755,000 and 802,000 units sold respectively. As of January 2023, the album had sold 3 million of units in the United States.

Bad Bunny charted all 20 album tracks on the US Hot Latin Songs ranking dated March 14, setting several records: most concurrently charting titles in the top 10 (8), in the top 20 (18) and in the top 25 (20). With eight top 10 songs on the chart, Bad Bunny outdid himself as he previously held the record for the most simultaneous top 10s, with six (September 2019). With 18 songs in the top 20, he surpassed J Balvin's nine-song mark (February 2020). Both Bad Bunny and Ozuna have placed 20 songs simultaneously on the chart. Bad Bunny brought his total career entries on the chart to a record 83, surpassing Daddy Yankee's 74 entries.

Bad Bunny also placed 11 album tracks simultaneously on the US Billboard Hot 100, the most for any Latin artist performing only in Spanish. YHLQMDLG became Spotify's most streamed album globally of 2020, with 3.3 billion streams during the year.

In Spain, the album debuted at number one on the charts. It was the most popular and most streamed album of 2020 in Spain.

Awards and nominations

Track listing 

Sample credits
 "Si Veo a Tu Mamá" contains interpolations from "The Girl from Ipanema", written by Antônio Carlos Jobim, Vinícius de Moraes and Norman Gimbel, performed by Stan Getz and João Gilberto.
 "La Santa" contains interpolations from "Aquí Está Tu Caldo", written and performed by Daddy Yankee.
 "Vete" contains interpolations from "Si Te Vas", written by Cesar Batista-Escalera, performed by Kartiel.
 "Ignorantes" contains interpolations from "No Sé Si Fue", written and performed by Arcángel and Zion.
 "Safaera" contains samples from "Get Ur Freak On", performed by Missy Elliott, "Could You Be Loved", performed by Bob Marley, "El Tiburón", performed by Alexis & Fido and an opening line from Cosculluela's "Pa' La Pared".

Charts

Weekly charts

Year-end charts

Certifications

References 

2020 albums
Bad Bunny albums
Albums produced by Tainy
Reggaeton albums
Latin trap albums
Latin pop albums by Puerto Rican artists
Grammy Award for Best Latin Pop Album